DSI Samson Group is a Sri Lankan family owned conglomerate established in 1962. It has over 29 subsidiaries and is a leading manufacture of footwear and rubber products in Sri Lanka.

History 
Established in 1962, by Diyunuge Samson Rajapaksa, JP as a footwear retail shop in Colombo Fort, he soon branched into manufacturing, importing and distribution by establishing a large retail network. Presently, it has over 200 showrooms (servicing 4000 dealer points island-wide), DSI footwear boasts the largest retail trading network in footwear

Governance structure
DSI Samson Group is governed by the Chairman and the Board of Directors which manages its diversified group of subsidiaries. 

Its current Group Chairman is Mahinda Rajapaksa, and its Group Managing Director is Kasun Rajapaksa.

Sectors

Footwear
DSI is the leading footwear manufacturer in Sri Lanka, having established the first shoe manufacturing plant on the Island in 1962. Its subsidiaries in this area include;
D Samson Industries (Pvt) Ltd
Samson Manufacturers (Pvt) Ltd

Retail
D. Samson & Sons (Pvt) Ltd
Samson Trading Company (Pvt) Ltd

Rubber
Vechenson (Pvt) Ltd
Samson Rubber Industries (Pvt) Ltd
Samson Rubber Products (Pvt) Ltd
Samson Compounds (Pvt) Ltd
Samson Reclaim Rubbers Ltd
Samson International PLC

Manufacturing
Samson International PLC
Samtessi Brush Manufacturers (Pvt) Ltd
SRG Holdings (Pvt) Ltd
Samson Bikes (Pvt) Ltd
Globe Knitting (Pvt) Ltd
Samson Rajarata Tiles (Pvt) Ltd

Engineering and Energy
Samson Engineers (Pvt) Ltd
Werapitiya Hydro Power (Pvt) Ltd
Hydro Trust Lanka (Pvt) Ltd

Food and Beverages
Mount Spring Water (Pvt) Ltd

Services
DTech (Pvt) Ltd 
Samson Group Corporate Services (Pvt) Ltd
Samson Insurance Brokers (Pvt) Ltd

References

External links
Official Website 

Conglomerate companies established in 1962
Conglomerate companies of Sri Lanka
1962 establishments in Ceylon